Wategaon is a town in Sangli district, Maharashtra, India. Wategaon (pop. 4,255) is a village in walva taluka lying 16 km (ten miles) west of Islampur and 9.65 km (six miles) north-west of Peth. It was once an alienated village and was held by a Brahman Kemavisdar under the Kurundvad chief to whom it belonged, it has sprung up on either side of the Bhogavati Ganga, a stream, and has better roads and streets as compared to other villages of its size. It is connected with Islampur and Peth by a good made road. There are a few traders trading in raw sugar and tobacco and other agricultural produce. Vateganv has a primary school, a high school, two private dispensaries and a post office. Wells and the Bhogavati Ganga stream provide drinking water.

Objects

Laksmi Narayan Temple

In the western half, on the left bank of the stream there are two temples, one each dedicated to Laksmi Narayan and Vatesvar Mahadev. The original portions of the structures are of finely hewn stones and consist of an inner shrine or gabhara about 0.2 m2 (ten feet square) and dome roofed. The entrance is through an arch 0.914 metres (three feet) wide and 0.914 metres (three feet) thick. There is a 0.19 (three feet) wide cross passage and another similar door leading by one step into the outer hall, which is about 1.30 m2 (14 feet square) cut off by oblique canopy like arches. The roof is also dome shaped and about 9.14 metres (30 feet) high, all of large stone. Two more steps lead into another mandap with galleries of rough work and is used for delivering or reciting puranas. The idols of Laksmi and Narayan are on a curious stand consisting of five upright blocks or slabs of highly polished stone each one broader than and ranged behind the other, the broadest being behind. The cuter corners of each are decorated with a carved pendant shaped like a ram's head, The gabhara is crowned by a pyramid like pinnacle about 12.19 metres (40 ft.) high from the ground decorated with figures of gods and goddesses in relief, in cut stone instead of in brick. The four corners of the gabhara and the inner mandap have smaller pinnacles to march and there is also a central pinnacle to the inner mandap. Except for a fine masonry wall built on the side of a stream, to court has nothing very significant. A noteworthy feature of the temple is the use of stone throughout, even for the internal domes and pinnacles. The effect internally is striking and the situation on the stream most picturesque. The original structure of the temple is said to have been built by one Ragho-pant Josi who was a native of Vateganv and who served as minister or karbhari to one of the subordinate chiefs of the Nimbalkar family in the time of Nana Fadanavis (1764–1800).

Vatesvar Temple

The Vatesvar temple is an insignificant edifice of rough trap and mortar, but has a strictly pyramidal pinnacle about 12.19 metres (40 feet) high. The courtyard is approximately 9.29 m2 (100 square feet) surrounded by ruined cloisters. The walls are of masonry about 4.21 metres (4 ft.) thick, of roughly cut rectangular blocks of trap each corner flanked with a small bastion. The wall on the southern side is now in bad repairs. A winding pavement with steps here and there leads to the entrance which is through an archway. The temple is beautifully situated at a sudden bend in the stream and behind it is a magnificent grove of tamarind trees. Though the name of the builder remains anonymous to date the temple is reported to be very antique.

Social reformer and writer Annabhau Sathe (Devanagari: अण्णाभाऊ साठे) was born in this village in 1920.

References

External links
 http://www.maharashtra.gov.in/english/gazetteer/SANGLI/places_Vategaon.html

Cities and towns in Sangli district